There were 126 cyclists who started the 1926 Tour de France; 82 of them were touriste-routiers, cyclists who did not have the support from a team. The other 44 cyclists started the race in teams; some teams only had two cyclists.
The two teams with favourites were Automoto and Alcyon. The Automoto team had Ottavio Bottecchia, the winner of the last two editions of the race, and Lucien Buysse, the runner-up of the previous edition. The Alcyon team had Bartolomeo Aymo and Nicolas Frantz, third and fourth in 1925. They also had Adelin Benoit, and the Tour organisation thought that the battle would be between Bottecchia and Benoit.

Cyclists

By team

By starting number

By nationality

References

1926 Tour de France
1926